Lourenço Osório de Aragão Ortigão Pinto, known as Lourenço Ortigão (born August 9, 1989), is a Portuguese actor.

Filmography

TV

Cinema

References

1989 births
21st-century Portuguese male actors
Portuguese male film actors
Living people
People from Lisbon